Jeong Woo-geun (born 1 March 1991) is a South Korean professional footballer as a striker for Police Tero in Thai League 1.

Club career
It was announced in January 2016 that Woo Geun-jeong would leave the Nakhon Pathom United and join BBCU.

References

External links

1991 births
Living people
Jeong Woo-geun
Jeong Woo-geun
K League 2 players
Jeong Woo-geun
Jeong Woo-geun
Jeong Woo-geun
Jeong Woo-geun
Jeong Woo-geun
Suwon FC players
South Korean footballers
South Korean expatriate footballers
Expatriate footballers in Thailand
Association football forwards
Sportspeople from Daejeon